Agonopterix goughi is a moth in the family Depressariidae. It was described by John David Bradley in 1958. It is found in South Africa and Saint Helena (Gough Island).

References

Moths described in 1958
Agonopterix
Moths of Africa